The 1990 NCAA Division I Men's Soccer Tournament was the 31st organized men's college soccer tournament by the National Collegiate Athletic Association, to determine the top college soccer team in the United States. The UCLA Bruins won their second national title by defeating the Rutgers Scarlet Knights, 1–0, in the championship game, after four overtime periods and a penalty kick shootout. This was the first championship game decided by penalty kicks. The final match was played on December 2, 1990, in Tampa, Florida, at USF Soccer Stadium. All the other games were played at the home field of the higher seeded team.

Early rounds

Final

See also  
 NCAA Division II Men's Soccer Championship
 NCAA Division III Men's Soccer Championship
 NAIA Men's Soccer Championship

References 

NCAA Division I Men's Soccer Tournament seasons
NCAA Division I Men's
Sports competitions in Tampa, Florida
NCAA Division I Men's Soccer
NCAA Division I Men's Soccer Tournament
Soccer in Florida